The women's 800 metres event at the 1997 European Athletics U23 Championships was held in Turku, Finland, on 12 and 13 July 1997.

Medalists

Results

Final
13 July

Heats
12 July
Qualified: first 2 in each heat and 2 best to the Final

Heat 1

Heat 2

Heat 3

Participation
According to an unofficial count, 19 athletes from 16 countries participated in the event.

 (1)
 (1)
 (1)
 (1)
 (1)
 (2)
 (1)
 (1)
 (2)
 (1)
 (1)
 (1)
 (2)
 (1)
 (1)
 (1)

References

800 metres
800 metres at the European Athletics U23 Championships